Indus/Winters Aire Park Airport  is located  southwest of Indus, Alberta, Canada.

See also

 List of airports in the Calgary area

References

External links
Place to Fly on COPA's Places to Fly airport directory

Registered aerodromes in Alberta
Rocky View County